American Carnage is a 2022 American comedy horror film written by Diego Hallivis and Julio Hallivis, directed by Diego Hallivis and starring Jorge Lendeborg Jr., Jenna Ortega and Eric Dane.

Cast
Jorge Lendeborg Jr. as JP
Allen Maldonado as Big Mac
Jenna Ortega as Camila
Eric Dane as Eddie
Brett Cullen as Harper Finn
Jorge Diaz as Chris
Bella Ortiz as Micah

Release
The film was released in theaters and on demand on July 15, 2022.

Reception
The film has a 58% rating on Rotten Tomatoes based on 24 reviews.

Matt Donato of IGN rated the film a 6 and wrote, "With shades of Get Out, Culture Shock, and The Forever Purge, American Carnage is yet another frightening-enough, albeit bogged-down, tale about how the American Dream is no longer for everyone."

Leigh Monson of The A.V. Club graded the film a B and wrote, "Suffice it to say that the film doesn’t reach the stylistic or narrative highs of its obvious predecessor, but if it’s not quite Get Out, the Hallivis Brothers translate issues facing Hispanic Americans to a horror scenario well worth getting into."

Alex Saveliev of Film Threat rated the film a 5 out of 10 and wrote, "American Carnage has its eye on the right target; it just misses the bull’s eye."

Noel Murray of the Los Angeles Times gave the film a positive review, calling it "a lively, impassioned and only slightly exaggerated take on how some people use anti-immigrant sentiment to distract from their own monstrous crimes."

References

External links
 
 

2022 comedy horror films
2022 horror films
2022 films
American comedy horror films
2020s English-language films
2020s American films
Films about food and drink
Films about cannibalism